Albert Dolmans (1928 - 2021) was a Dutch-American painter. He began his career in the sixties becoming part of the Bay Area Figurative Movement and the Society of Western Artists.

Biography 
Born in Breda, Netherlands in 1928, he emigrated with his parents and grew up in Berkeley.  He was awarded a scholarship to the California College of the Arts in Oakland, studying under George Post, Karl Baumann and Otis Oldfield.  He has devoted himself to an international career in fine art, dividing his time mainly between Europe and the United States. Apart from his pen and ink work, his preferred mediums are oil, watercolor and pastel. Dolmans' paintings have been said to be mainly divided in two groups: warm paintings with a lot of ochre and purple in California, as opposed to cool, controlled, fresh-colored green and blue paintings for the Netherlands.  His work has been exhibited internationally, becoming part of both private and municipal collections. His paintings were included in three major exhibits. The first in The Hague in 1976 to commemorate the Bicentennial of the United States, the second in 1982, celebrating 200 years of diplomatic relations between the United States and the Netherlands, and later the same year in San Francisco, a special exhibit marking the official visit of the Queen of the Netherlands to that city.  His paintings make part of the permanent collection of the Stedelijk Museum of Breda, the Netherlands.

References 

 Elsevier (Magazine), "Albert Dolmans: American 'Brabander'", May 1980.
  Albert Dolmans (2013) Painting is my life (Autobiography), Zutphen: CPI Koninklijke Wöhrmann, pp. 140.
  Albert Dolmans (2015) My Drawings, Zutphen: CPI Koninklijke Wöhrmann, . pp. 113.
 Society of Western Artists, "23rd Annual Exhibition of Art", M.H. de Young Memorial Museum, San Francisco (CA), April 1964.
 Contra Costa Times (CA), "Living Arts: Albert Dolmans", April 29, 1973, p. 12.
 "Tentoonstelling Albert Dolmans", Het Stadsblad voor West-Brabant, 5 February 1975, p. 4.
 Albert Dolmans, Profile & Profile Images sourced 18 June 2015.
 Leo van Heijningen, Albert Dolmans bij Kunstzaal van Heijningen in Den Haag, text available on ISSUU, sourced 6 June 2015

Footnotes 

   

1928 births
Living people
Artists from California
Culture in the San Francisco Bay Area
Artists from Berkeley, California
Dutch emigrants to the United States
People from Breda
Artists from the San Francisco Bay Area
California College of the Arts alumni